Tanuma (written: 田沼 lit "rice field swamp") is a Japanese surname. Notable people with the surname include:

, Japanese rugby union player
, Japanese rōjū and daimyō
, Japanese photographer

See also
Tanuma Station, a railway station in Sano, Tochigi Prefecture, Japan
Tanuma, Tochigi, former town in Aso District, Tochigi Prefecture, Japan

Japanese-language surnames